is a private junior college in Kirishima, Kagoshima, Japan.

History 
The college was established in 1966. It adopted its present name in 1985.

Courses
 Early childhood education

References

External links 
  

Japanese junior colleges
Educational institutions established in 1966
Private universities and colleges in Japan
Universities and colleges in Kagoshima Prefecture